Manx Airlines was an English-owned, Isle of Man-based airline that existed between 1982 and 2002. Its head office was located on the grounds of Isle of Man Airport in Ballasalla, Malew. An airline of the same name existed between 1947 and 1958.

History

Manx Airlines (1953)
An earlier Manx Airlines was established in 1947 as Manx Air Charters and renamed in 1953. It was based at Ronaldsway Airport and equipped with De Havilland Dragon Rapides and Douglas C-47 Dakotas. The airline also operated the Bristol Freighter and its aircraft were equipped with passenger modules. One of this airline's Bristol Freighters crashed on 27 February 1958 in the Winter Hill air disaster. The airline was absorbed by Silver City Airways in 1958 and then merged with Channel Air Bridge to form British United Air Ferries in 1963.

Manx Airlines (1982)
The new Manx Airlines was a joint venture founded by British Midland Airways and AirUK. Services commenced on 1 November 1982 and the first flight was JE601, flown from its base at Isle of Man Airport at Ronaldsway, by its Bandeirante to Glasgow.

From 1985 until 1993, the airline employed the Shorts 360 and the Shorts 330. A Vickers Viscount 836 was operated from October 1982 until October 1988. Before retirement, the Viscount performed several 'champagne' flights, as it was the last to operate scheduled passenger services in the UK.

Manx flew a Saab 340 during 1987–88 and bore "City Hopper" titles when operating the Liverpool-Heathrow shuttle service. In October 1988, the airline collected its first BAe ATP, replacing the Viscount. Manx also flew the BAe 146. Eventually, the airline owned seventeen ATPs. The airline was successful in acquiring Business Air in 1991.

Fleet

Manx Airlines operated the following types of aircraft:

 Vickers Viscount
 Fokker Friendship
 Embraer EMB 110 Bandeirante
 BAC 1-11
 BAe ATP
 Jetstream 31
 Jetstream 41
 BAe 146
Series 100
Series 200
Series 300
 Britten-Norman Islander
 de Havilland Canada DHC-6 Twin Otter
 Embraer EMB 110
 Embraer ERJ 145
 Fokker F27 Friendship
 Piper PA-23
 Piper PA-31
 Saab 340
 Shorts 330
 Shorts 360
 ATR 72
 McDonnell Douglas DC-9

Expansion and sale 
Manx Airlines Europe
In March 1991, Manx Airlines created Manx Airlines Europe in order to expand and fly routes within the United Kingdom. In 1994, Manx Airlines Europe became a franchise carrier for British Airways, its fleet flying in the colours of British Airways. 
British Regional Airlines
In September 1996, Manx Airlines Europe changed its name to British Regional Airlines. In March 2001, British Airways purchased the British Regional Airlines Group (holding company of British Regional Airlines and Manx Airlines) for £78 million. 
The airline merged with Brymon Airways to create British Airways CitiExpress.

Manx Airlines ceased operations on 31 August 2002. Between March 1999 and the date of closure, the fleet was as follows:

The last flight was planned to be flown by BAe 146 G-MIMA, from London (Gatwick) to Isle of Man Airport (Ronaldsway). However, due to technical problems, a sub-chartered aircraft was brought in to operate this service. Therefore, the honour of operating the last Manx Airlines flight (JE 818 Birmingham International to Ronaldsway) went to Manx-born pilot Captain Paul Quine, who was in command of ATP G-MANB, which landed at Ronaldsway at 20:10 GMT on Saturday, 31 August 2002.

See also
 de:Manx Airlines (1947)
 List of defunct airlines of the United Kingdom

References
Notes

Bibliography

External links

Defunct airlines of the Isle of Man
Airlines established in 1982
Airlines disestablished in 2002
1982 establishments in the Isle of Man
2002 disestablishments in the Isle of Man
Defunct airlines of the United Kingdom